Jacob Louis Molinas (October 31, 1931 – August 3, 1975) was an American professional basketball player and a key figure in one of the most wide-reaching point shaving scandals in college basketball.

Early life 
Molinas grew up in Brooklyn and attended Stuyvesant High School. His parents owned a bar on Coney Island.

College career
He attended Columbia University from 1950 to 1953 where he played basketball. In the 1952-1953 season he was the captain of Columbia's team and led the team in scoring. In 1953, he set a team record for most points scored in a game—a mark that was eclipsed a few years later by Chet Forte.

Professional career 
The Fort Wayne Pistons drafted him third in the 1953 NBA Draft and played in 32 games before the league banned him for wagering on Pistons games. Molinas was selected for the 1954 NBA All-Star Game but was suspended at the time of the game and was replaced by teammate Andy Phillip. He later sued the NBA for $3 million, claiming the league's ban was an unreasonable restraint of trade. Judge Irving Kaufman ruled against him in the case.

Molinas played in the Eastern Professional Basketball League (EPBL) from 1954 to 1962 for the Williamsport Billies, Hazleton Hawks and Wilkes-Barre Barons. He was selected as the EPBL Most Valuable Player in 1956. Molinas was a five-time All-EPBL First Team selection (1955–1958, 1960) and two-time Second Team selection (1959, 1961). He served as a player-coach for the Hawks during the 1960–61 season.

After his playing career, he entered the Brooklyn Law School from where he graduated with a law degree. Before his admission to law school, the Bronx County District Attorney investigated his case and concluded that he had not committed a crime. The bar association also reviewed his case and admitted him to the New York Bar.

Career statistics

NBA regular season

EPBL regular season

Legal issues 
In 1973, authorities arrested and charged him with interstate shipment of pornography. He was due to stand trial on those charges at the time of his death.

Personal life

Match fixing 
Molinas became the central figure in the 1961 point-shaving scandal. The gambling ring went on from 1957 to 1960 and involved 50 players from 27 colleges. Two of the most notable players ensnared in the scandal were future Hall of Famers Connie Hawkins and Roger Brown. Molinas gave Hawkins $250 during his freshman year at Iowa, but never encouraged him to throw games. Although Molinas never implicated Hawkins in any way, both Hawkins and Brown were effectively blackballed from both collegiate and professional basketball, until signing with the upstart American Basketball Association (ABA) in 1967. Hawkins also played in the American Basketball League (ABL) for its entire existence, 1961–63, and afterwards appealed towards the NBA in allowing him to play again, starting in 1969 with the Phoenix Suns. Meanwhile, Brown spent his entire professional career in the rival ABA, leading the Indianapolis Pacers to three ABA titles before retiring from basketball in 1975; the Indiana Pacers retired his number (#35) on November 2, 1985.

In 1963, Molinas was convicted for his role in the scheme and was sentenced to 10 to 15 years in prison. He was paroled in 1968 after serving five years. Molinas was said to have contacts with New York City mobster Thomas Eboli.

Death 
At 2:00 AM on August 3, 1975 at age 43, Molinas was killed while standing in the backyard of his home in Los Angeles. Eugene Connor fired five shots while standing in the yard of Molinas' neighbor using a long barreled .22 caliber pistol steadied on the fence. Molinas was hit in the neck, and his girlfriend and dog were both wounded as well.

Police did not rule out a mob-related murder. His business partner Bernard Gusoff had been beaten to death in November 1974.

See also
List of Stuyvesant High School people
CCNY point shaving scandal
Connie Hawkins
Roger Brown

References

1931 births
1975 deaths
American men's basketball coaches
American men's basketball players
American sportspeople convicted of crimes
Banned National Basketball Association players
Basketball players from New York City
Columbia Lions men's basketball players
Deaths by firearm in California
Eastern Basketball Association coaches
Fort Wayne Pistons draft picks
Fort Wayne Pistons players
Male murder victims
Murdered American Jews
National Basketball Association All-Stars
People murdered in Los Angeles
Power forwards (basketball)
Small forwards
Sportspeople involved in betting scandals
Stuyvesant High School alumni
Match fixers